Eyjeaux is a commune in the Haute-Vienne department in the Nouvelle-Aquitaine region in western France. The current mayor is Jacques Roux.

See also
Communes of the Haute-Vienne department

References

Communes of Haute-Vienne